The Boeing XB-39 Superfortress was a United States prototype bomber aircraft, a single example of the B-29 Superfortress converted to fly with alternative powerplants. It was intended to demonstrate that the B-29 could still be put into service even if the first choice of engine, the air-cooled Wright R-3350 radial engine, ran into development or production difficulties.

Design and development
Starting life as the first YB-29 delivered to the United States Army Air Forces, it was sent in November 1943 to the Fisher Body Aircraft Development Section of General Motors to be converted to use Allison V-3420-17 liquid-cooled W24 (twin-V12, common crankcase) inline engines. Fisher was chosen for the modification as it was familiar with the engine, as it was to power the P-75 Eagle that they were then developing. Testing on it began in early 1944.

Further development of the engine and the aircraft was delayed by a series of changes in the planned turbosuperchargers, as the originally specified GE Type CM-2 two-stage turbosupercharger became unavailable due to demands on GE's production of its other turbosuperchargers. Other turbosuperchargers were considered, but the end result was that the first flights of the B-39 had to be made without any turbosuperchargers at all.

Operational history

Fisher finally focused again on the B-39. The first flight of the B-39 was made on 9 December 1944 at Cleveland, Ohio. The initial flight tests of the B-39, without turbosuperchargers installed, were impressive. However, the B-39 program was by now seriously delayed, and the flawed R-3350 B-29s had already been rushed into combat in June 1944.

Despite continuing problems with the B-29s, the aircraft was functioning well enough in combat that it no longer made any sense to shift resources in the manufacturing base to a new engine for the B-29 and so the B-39 was not ordered into production.

Specifications (XB-39)

See also

References

Notes

Bibliography

 Jones, Lloyd S. U.S. Bombers, B-1 1928 to B-1 1980s. Fallbrook, California: Aero Publishers, 1962, second edition 1974. .
 Whitney, Daniel. Vee's For Victory!. Atglen, Pennsylvania: Schiffer Military History, 1998.

External links

 XB-39 on USAF Museum site

B-39 Superfortress
Boeing B-39 Superfortress
Four-engined tractor aircraft
XB-39
Mid-wing aircraft
Aircraft first flown in 1944
Four-engined piston aircraft